The Tortellis is an American sitcom television series and the first spin-off of Cheers, starring Dan Hedaya and Jean Kasem. It aired on NBC from January 22 to May 12, 1987.

Synopsis
Hedaya and Kasem had appeared on Cheers on several occasions as Nick and Loretta Tortelli, who were (respectively) Carla Tortelli's loutish ex-husband and his cheerful, bubble-headed new trophy wife. The series co-stars Timothy Williams as Anthony Tortelli, Nick and Carla's teenage son, and Mandy Ingber as Annie Tortelli, Anthony's young bride, reprising their roles from Cheers.

At the beginning of the series, Loretta leaves Nick and moves to Las Vegas to live with her sensible, divorced sister Charlotte (played by Carlene Watkins), and Charlotte's young son Mark (Aaron Moffat). The series follows Nick as he moves to Las Vegas to try to reconcile with Loretta, vowing to change his sleazy, conniving ways in the process. Nick and Loretta tentatively get back together, and Nick sets up a TV repair business and tries to reform—not always successfully. Anthony and Annie follow Nick to Las Vegas, and all six characters live in the same house.

After the series was canceled, all four Tortelli characters returned to Cheers, where it was revealed that Nick's TV repair business in Las Vegas went under, but also that Nick and Loretta were still together (albeit somewhat shakily) and were still living in Las Vegas.

The characters of Charlotte and Mark Cooper were never seen or even referred to on any episode of Cheers, either before or after The Tortellis run.

Cast
 Dan Hedaya as Nick Tortelli (ex-husband of Carla Tortelli on Cheers)
 Jean Kasem as Loretta Tortelli
 Timothy Williams as Anthony Tortelli
 Mandy Ingber as Annie Tortelli
 Carlene Watkins as Charlotte Cooper
 Aaron Moffatt as Mark Cooper

Guest stars
 Rhea Perlman appeared as her Cheers character Carla in the pilot, in a dream sequence.
 George Wendt (Norm Peterson) and John Ratzenberger (Cliff Clavin)  appeared in episode 3, paying a visit to Las Vegas and meeting up with Nick.
 Mitchell Laurance was seen in a recurring role as Pete Bruno, Charlotte's untrustworthy boyfriend.

Reception and cancellation
The Tortellis drew sharp criticism for its stereotypical depiction of Italian Americans. Television writer Bill Kelley wrote: "The Italian-American Anti-Defamation League should be about as enchanted with Nick Tortelli as it was with The Untouchables."

The series drew low ratings, ranking 50th out of 79 series with an average rating/share of 13.3/20. As a result, NBC canceled The Tortellis after 13 episodes. The next attempt at a Cheers spin-off, Frasier, was considerably more successful, running for 11 seasons.

Episodes

References

External links
 
 

1987 American television series debuts
1987 American television series endings
1980s American sitcoms
American television spin-offs
Cheers
English-language television shows
NBC original programming
Television series by CBS Studios
Television shows set in the Las Vegas Valley